The Williamsport Red Sox were a minor league baseball team, based in Williamsport, Pennsylvania. The team began in 1964 as the Williamsport Mets a class-AA affiliate of the New York Mets, in the Eastern League, from 1964 through 1967. The club played all of its games at Williamsport's Bowman Stadium. Among the future major leaguers who played for the Williamsport Mets are: Jerry Koosman,  Ken Boswell, Kevin Collins, Nolan Ryan and Jim Bethke.

In 1968, the club entered the New York–Penn League, with a new major league affiliate, the Houston Astros. The team was renamed the Williamsport Astros as a result. By 1971 the club changed its affiliation to the Boston Red Sox and its name to the Williamsport Red Sox.  Managed by Dick Berardino, the Red Sox went 30-39-1 their first season, finishing 6th in the 8-team NY-Penn. Steve Foran (10-4, 2.38) was the only All-Star, striking out a league-high 138 in 117 innings and also leading in wins and finishing 5th in ERA. 1B Jack Baker (.249/~.358/.502) was second in the league with 12 homers. The most prominent player to emerge from the team, though, was clearly OF Jim Rice, who was far from a star that year with a .256/~.308/.409 line.

The Red Sox continued under Berardino in 1972 but finished last at 22-47. They drew 19,038 fans, 5th in the league, and were outscored 411-278. The team managed no All-Stars though they again had the #2 home run hitter – this time it was 1B-OF Chester Lucas (.285/~.366/.500), who hit 12 long balls. The best career would belong to Don Aase, who led the league in losses with a miserable 0-10, 5.81 season. The team did not play another season.

Sources: 1972 and 1973 Baseball Guides

Notable alumni

Baseball Hall of Fame alumni

 Jim Rice (1971) Inducted, 2009
 Nolan Ryan (1966) Inducted, 1999

Notable alumni

 Don Aase (1972) MLB All-Star
 Bo Diaz (1971) 2 x MLB All-Star
 Duffy Dyer (1966-1967)
 Ken Forsch (1968) 2 x MLB All-Star
 Jerry Koosman (1965) 2 x MLB All-Star
 Steve Renko (1966)
 Roy Sievers (1967, MGR) 5 x MLB All-Star; 1949 AL Rookie of the Year
 Ron Swoboda (1964)
 Bill Virdon (1966, MGR) 1955 NL Rookie of the Year
 Ernie Whitt (1972) MLB All-Star

Year-by-year record

Defunct New York–Penn League teams
Defunct Eastern League (1938–present) teams
Defunct baseball teams in Pennsylvania
Red Sox
Boston Red Sox minor league affiliates
Houston Astros minor league affiliates
New York Mets minor league affiliates
1964 establishments in Pennsylvania
1972 disestablishments in Pennsylvania
Baseball teams established in 1964
Baseball teams disestablished in 1972